William Gilbert may refer to:

Arts
William Gilbert (author) (1804–1890), English novelist and surgeon (father of W. S. Gilbert)
W. S. Gilbert (1836–1911), British dramatist who was part of the comic opera team of Gilbert and Sullivan
Billy Gilbert (silent film actor) or William V. Campbell (1891–1961), American silent film actor
Billy Gilbert (1894–1971), American comedian born William Barron
Willie Gilbert (1916–1980), American author and playwright

Politicians
William Gilbert (MP for Derby) (fl. 1530), Member of Parliament (MP)  for Derby
William Gilbert (politician) (1829–1919), South Australian parliamentarian and philanthropist
William A. Gilbert (1815–1875), American politician

Sports
William Gilbert (cricketer) (1856–1918), English cricketer
Bill Gilbert (baseball) (1868–1927), American baseball player
Billy Gilbert (baseball) (1876–1927), Major League Baseball second baseman
Willy Gilbert (1881–1956), Norwegian sailor
Billy Gilbert (footballer) (born 1959), English former footballer
Bill Gilbert (speedway rider), English speedway rider

Others
William Gilbert (physician) (1544–1603), English physicist and physician
William W. Gilbert (c. 1746–1832), American silversmith
William Gilbert (rugby) (1799–1877), British cobbler & rugby-ball maker
William Ball Gilbert (1847–1931), American judge
William Gilbert (pastoralist) (1850–1923), South Australian pastoralist and vigneron
Bill Gilbert (intelligence service director) (1916–1987), New Zealand military leader and intelligence service director

See also